is a Japanese television drama series that aired on NHK in 2010.

Cast
 Kyōka Suzuki as Rui Nakamura
 Kyoko Fukada as Marie Suzuki
 Hiroki Hasegawa as Kō Suzuki
 You as Akiko
 Gō Ayano as Ryō Nakamura

Reception
Kyōka Suzuki won the Award for Best Actress at the 2011 Tokyo Drama Awards.

References

External links
 

2010 Japanese television series debuts
2010 Japanese television series endings
Japanese drama television series
NHK original programming